Culbertson–Harbison Farm is a historic home and farm complex located at Greene Township in Franklin County, Pennsylvania. The house was built between 1798 and 1800, and is a two-story, five bay, limestone dwelling in the Federal style.  It has a two-story, three bay stone addition built between 1820 and 1840.  Attached to the addition is a frame kitchen addition and brick smokehouse.  Also on the property are the contributing large frame Pennsylvania bank barn with three hexagonal cupolas, a small frame privy, and other outbuildings.

It was listed on the National Register of Historic Places in 1980.

References 

Farms on the National Register of Historic Places in Pennsylvania
Houses on the National Register of Historic Places in Pennsylvania
Federal architecture in Pennsylvania
Houses completed in 1800
Houses in Franklin County, Pennsylvania
National Register of Historic Places in Franklin County, Pennsylvania